Sumisip, officially the Municipality of Sumisip (Yakan: Bulak Sumisip; Chavacano: Municipalidad de Sumisip), is a 1st class municipality in the province of Basilan, Philippines. According to the 2020 census, it has a population of 47,345 people.

12 barangays that were not on Basilan Island seceded to form the municipality of Tabuan-Lasa through Muslim Mindanao Autonomy Act No. 187, which was subsequently ratified in a plebiscite held on March 29, 2008.

Geography

Barangays
Sumisip is politically subdivided into 29 barangays.

Climate

Demographics

In the 2020 census, Sumisip had a population of 47,345.

Economy

Notable people
 

Haber Amin Asarul, politician

References

External links
Sumisip Profile at the DTI Cities and Municipalities Competitive Index
[ Philippine Standard Geographic Code]

Municipalities of Basilan